Daniel Chavarría (23 November 1933 – 6 April 2018) was a Uruguayan revolutionary, writer and translator, who lived in Cuba since the 1960s. He had a son with Dora Salazar, Daniel Chavarria, and raised his sister.

Life and works 
Daniel Chavarría was born in San José de Mayo, Uruguay.

In 1964, while Chavarría was living in Brazil, there was a military coup and he fled to work amongst the gold seekers in the Amazon. Later on, he fled to Cuba. There he began working as a Latin and Greek translator and teacher. Subsequently he began his career as a writer. Daniel Chavarría defined himself as a Uruguayan citizen and a Cuban writer.

Chavarría’s style of writing  is within the Latin American tradition of political writers, such as Gabriel García Márquez. He mentioned that as a child, he read Jules Verne, Emilio Salgari and Alexandre Dumas, and their influence can be detected in his writing. For example, in Tango for a Torturer, the influence of The Count of Monte Cristo is clear.

Chavarría’s life and writings clearly show his communist and revolutionary background. He was a well known supporter of the Cuban Revolution.

In 2010, Chavarría won Cuba's National Prize for Literature.

Chavarría died in Havana on 6 April 2018, aged 84.

Bibliography 
 1978 Joy
 1984 The 6th Island
 1991 Allá Ellos
 1993 The Eye of Cybele
 1994 Adiós muchachos
 1999 That Year in Madrid
 2001 Tango for a Torturer
 2001 El rojo en la pluma del loro
 2004 Viudas de sangre
 2005 Príapos
 2006 Una pica en Flandes

Awards 
Joy:
 Aniversario de la Revolución, La Habana, 1975.
 Capitán San Luis, 1978.

The 6th island:
 Premio de la Crítica, La Habana.

Allá ellos:
 Dashiell Hammett Award, Gijón, 1992.

The Eye of Cybele:
 Planeta-Joaquín Mortiz, México, 1993.
 Educación y Cultura, Montevideo, 1994.
 Ennio Flaiano, Pescara, 1998.
 Premio de la Crítica, La Habana.

Adiós Muchachos:
 Edgar Allan Poe Award - Best Paperback Original, New York, 2002

Tango for a Torturer:
 Casa de las Américas Prize, La Habana, 2000.
 Premio de la Crítica, La Habana.

Viudas de sangre:
 Premio Alejo Carpentier, La Habana, 2004.

Other
 National Prize for Literature, 2010

References

External links 
Perché ho deciso di vivere a Cuba 

1933 births
2018 deaths
Cuban communists
Uruguayan communists
People from San José de Mayo
Uruguayan expatriates in Cuba
Uruguayan people of Basque descent
Uruguayan autobiographers
Uruguayan translators